The Mataje River is a South American river belonging to the Pacific slope and that for approximately half of its route is the border between Colombia and Ecuador.

The river flows into the bay of Ancón de Sardinas, point where the maritime border between Colombia and Ecuador begins.

References

Rivers of Colombia
Rivers of Ecuador
Colombia–Ecuador border
International rivers of South America
Border rivers